MCSP can refer to:
 Merlin Capability Sustainment Plus: Mid-Life Update of Merlin (see Lockheed Martin U.K. and AgustaWestland EH101)
 Melanoma-associated chondroitin sulfate proteoglycan, a tumour marker
 Member of the Chartered Society of Physiotherapy
 Minimum cost spanning tree, the lowest costing way to construct a spanning tree graph.
 Multichannel Serial Port: A subsystem of Texas Instruments TMS320 DSPs.